Here Comes Cookie is a 1935 American comedy film directed by Norman Z. McLeod, written by Don Hartman, and starring George Burns, Gracie Allen, George Barbier, Betty Furness, Andrew Tombes and Rafael Storm. The picture was released on August 30, 1935, by Paramount Pictures.

Plot
Millionaire Harrison Allen is determined that his daughter Phyllis does not marry her fortune-hunting beau, Ramon del Ramos. Harrison and his secretary, George Burns, draw up a document in which Harrison temporarily signs over his fortune to his other daughter Gracie, who calls herself "Cookie," for a period of sixty days, in order to prove Ramon's avarice. While Harrison goes back to his hometown for a vacation, witless Gracie takes her father's farce to heart and proceeds to destroy his fortune and his home. She cuts George's salary, refuses to send her father any money, and destroys everyone's clothes so they will look like tramps. While the butler, Botts, George and Phyllis slowly starve, they also lose their sleep because Gracie turns the mansion into a no-cost boardinghouse for hundreds of out-of-work actors and their animals. When Ramon realizes that Gracie has all the money, he pursues her, and she naively decides to marry him. Spirits reach an all-time low when Botts finds it preferable to sleep on a park bench, rather than compete with an actor for a bed. At his wits end, Botts sells a trained seal to raise enough money to send Phyllis to Clarksville and retrieve her father. Meanwhile, Gracie is tearing down the inside of the mansion to construct a theater. She plans to stage a show that will do so poorly, that the family will be broke and Harrison will let her marry Ramon. Since Gracie has sent no money, Harrison and Phyllis are forced to hitchhike part of the way home. They arrive in a taxicab, owing the driver over one hundred dollars, on the opening night of "Gracie Allen's Flop," but are refused admittance. They sneak into the mansion and stumble on stage during Gracie's unintentionally comic balcony scene from Romeo and Juliet . George brings telegrams from Hollywood with offers to hire Gracie as a producer, because her show is a big success. At Harrison's insistence, George agrees to marry Gracie, but only on condition that while she is on the West Coast, he is in the East.

Cast
George Burns as George Burns
Gracie Allen as Gracie Allen
George Barbier as Harrison Allen
Betty Furness as Phyllis Allen
Andrew Tombes as Botts
Rafael Storm as Ramon del Ramos
James Burke as Broken-Nose Reilly
Lee Kohlmar as Mr. Dingledorp
Milla Davenport as Mrs. Dingledorp
Harry Holman as Stuffy
Frank Darien as Clyde
Jack Powell as Drummer
Irving Bacon as Thompson
Guinn "Big Boy" Williams as Big Boy
Nick Moro as Specialty Act 
Frank Yaconelli as Specialty Act 
The Six Olympics as Acrobats
The Buccaneers as Vaudeville Act
The Six Candreya Brothers as Vaudeville Act
Johnson and Dove as Vaudeville Act
Three Jacks and a Queen as Vaudeville Act
The Wheelers as Vaudeville Act

References

External links
 

1935 films
American comedy films
1935 comedy films
Paramount Pictures films
Films directed by Norman Z. McLeod
American black-and-white films
1930s English-language films
1930s American films